CTC is a television station in Canberra, Australia. The station was the tenth to begin transmission in regional Australia, and the 26th station in Australia as a whole. CTC has an affiliation agreement to show content from Network 10. Just as it has had a number of owners, CTC has also had many different identities on-air – including CTC-TV, Super 7, Capital 7, 10 TV Australia, Capital Television, Ten Capital, Southern Cross Ten, Channel 9 and Channel 10.  The station is owned and operated by Southern Cross 10.

History

Origins
The station's history can be traced back to 19 May 1958, when Canberra Television Limited (or CTL), a public company, was formed by executives of The Federal Capital Press of Australia Pty. Ltd. (owner of The Canberra Times newspaper) and Canberra Broadcasters Pty Ltd (owner of local radio station 2CA). Both companies injected A£45,000 (A$90,000) into the business in order to apply for the Canberra-area commercial television licence.  The first chairman of the newly formed company was Arthur Shakespeare, founder of The Canberra Times.

Alongside four other applicants, CTL submitted their licence application to the Australian Broadcasting Control Board (ABCB) in April 1959. The company went public in September of the same year, on the Australian Securities Exchange in Sydney, offering 100,000 shares which were immediately oversubscribed, ending up with a total subscribed capital of A£300,000 (A$600,000). The two key shareholders in CTL made an agreement with all other shareholders that all shares were to be bought back in the event that they were unsuccessful in their licence bid — they need not have worried, since after a hearing of considerable length, the ABCB decided to grant CTL the licence in November 1960. The callsign for the station was to be CTC and the new service was to transmit on VHF channel 7.

Prior to the acquisition of the licence, CTL needed to find suitable sites for both a studio and a transmitter. Initially, Mount Ainslie (approximately 10 km north-east of Canberra's city centre, at an elevation of 842 m above sea level) was considered as a potential transmitter site. It was turned down, however, because it was already under the control of the Department of Civil Aviation (who would be unwilling to surrender or lease the site due to its proximity to the Airport and the Air Force base). It was also determined that a transmitter located atop Mount Ainslie would not provide ample coverage of the entire Canberra area (notable black-spots would have included the Woden and Belconnen districts), nor would there be enough room for the ABC's television transmitter (whose service was due to commence in December 1962) as well as CTC. Other sites considered included Mounts Gray, Bowning, Ginini and Bull's Head.

Ultimately, the site chosen for both the transmitter and the studio was Black Mountain, approximately 5 km west of the city centre at 812 m above sea level. Extensive tests from the site proved that it was the ideal location for the transmitter, with signals adequately covering the Canberra area. The ABC also decided to place their transmitter atop Black Mountain — both would be perched atop guyed masts (as opposed to towers) with each rising to 126 metres and 152 metres, respectively. ABC's studio would be located in Canberra city proper. In order to access the transmitters and studio, a road needed to be built up to the summit — construction commenced in July 1961. CTL were granted the lease to the Black Mountain site on 26 September 1961.

The studio complex, which, in later years, would be affectionately known as 'the tin shed' was planned, designed and constructed by Civil & Civic over a period of 28 weeks (from September 1961 – March 1962) at a total cost of £77,912 (A$155,824). Occupying a  site, the complex featured a 140-square-metre studio area and was fitted out with RCA equipment — two TK-12 4½" image orthicon cameras were purchased for use in the studio at a cost of £8,000 (A$16 000) each. The transmitter (whose mast was erected in March 1962) was custom-designed by Co-El of Italy, and the mast EPT Limited in Sydney.

Test transmissions started in April 1962 and local reports of excellent picture quality exceeded expectations in coverage area. It was reported the vast majority of Canberra and Queanbeyan viewers required no outside antenna at all. Viewers in Yass reported a perfect signal and homes in higher parts of Cooma also, unexpectedly, were able to receive CTC 7. Goulburn television retailers reported heavy set orders in the lead-up to CTC's commencement - though the town could already enjoy a television signal from WIN 4 Wollongong.

Opening night
By the end of April 1962, both the studio and transmitter was completed and the first test patterns were transmitted. On 23 May 1962 at 5:45pm, the first live test transmission took place with the Safety Bureau Officer, Senior Constable T. A. M. Cooper presenting a 13-minute public service announcement on the proper use of fireworks.

Although CTC 7 commenced transmission at 6pm on 2 June 1962 with various program promotions and a documentary on the construction of the CTC studios, the official opening was not to take place until 7pm — as well as Postmaster-General Charles Davidson, CTL chairmen A. T. Shakespeare, Sir Patrick McGovern and station manager George Barlin also assisted with the opening proceedings. An introduction to CTC's on-screen personalities was followed by a news summary. Viewers were then treated to a film of the Queen's Birthday Procession from the military barracks at Duntroon (filmed earlier that day), followed by an hour of variety with The B.P. Super Show hosted by Margaret Fonteyn. The detective series Michael Shayne made its premiere on CTC then a kinescope of the opening ceremony was screened. The first night's programming concluded with an epilogue and a preview of the following day's programmes before ending transmission at 10:30pm.

Welcoming the neighbours
On 18 December 1962, CTC-7's first television rival, ABC-3, commenced broadcasting in Canberra. CTC manager George Barlin welcomed the arrival of the new station, which would viewers in the area would have a 'complete television service'. Mr Barlin pointed out there had been a great enthusiasm for television in the Canberra area, with around 42% of homes owning or renting a television within six months of the commencement of local television services.

CTC relayed its first programme to another station on 11 October 1964, with a simulcast transmission of an Olympic Games presentation by RVN-2 in Wagga. Olympic Games reports were received at the new ABC-3 studios in Canberra, which was connected to ABN-2 Sydney via coaxial cable. The video-taped footage was then prepared for screening by CTC-7 that evening. RVN-2 installed new receiving equipment to repeat a clear signal from Canberra.

1970s – Colouring the Capital 

CTC was a pioneer of colour television, commissioning the first purpose-built colour production studio and film laboratory in Australia. The new facility in Watson opened in October 1974 costing over $2 million and boasted sales and administration, a full size production studio supplemented by two smaller studios for commercial recordings and on-air presentation. As the facility was fully equipped only with colour equipment over 80% of the broadcasts were in colour, five months before the official commencement date of 1 March 1975. Although technically in breach of the Australian Broadcasting Control Board rules, CTC was the first television station in Australia to broadcast the majority of its output in colour. A rare piece of CTC colour news film from 21 October 1974 can be seen at the National Film & Sound Archive.

1980s – From Super 7 to Channel 10 
 Kerry Stokes acquired a majority stake in CTC from John Fairfax & Sons warehousing company Surita on 7 May 1980, heading off a rival bid from Television Wollongong Transmissions Ltd (owners of WIN 4) which had increased its stake from 5 to 15 per cent. At the time Stokes owned a share in the Golden West Network in Western Australia.
The station shrugged off its decidedly 70s Super 7 branding and the call sign letters CTC were reintroduced to the station identity.

The 1980s were an exciting time in Canberra a new, but maturing city. Telecom Tower, a  broadcasting facility atop Black Mountain opened on 15 May 1980 and quickly became a major Canberra landmark. A vital link for television and telephone connections between Sydney and Melbourne, the tower also became the transmission site for CTC's primary VHF 7 signal alongside ABC on VHF 3 and ABC FM 101.9. CTC's original studio building was demolished to make way for the tower and the station produced a 12-minute film on the construction of Telecom Tower which was shown at the visitor's centre.

No sooner had Telecom Tower opened, work commenced on Canberra's other most prominent landmark – a new Parliament House. A building so large it would have its own unique postcode. In the winter of 1981 CTC embarked upon a massive rebrand. A new logo whose design and colours were based on the Australian national flag was introduced and Capital 7 burst on to screens. Reflecting Canberra's status as the heart of the nation, the station produced a 60-second feel-good promo and promotional 45 RPM single, Song for Canberra which featured early earthworks at Parliament House and showcased a vibrant and young capital.

Under Stokes the number of broadcast hours increased and the local news bulletin was scaled up from a 15-minute auxiliary to a full local, national and international service. In 1982 breakfast television commenced on CTC, with a relay of Nine Network programming. Canberra's only commercial television station beginning to more closely resembling a metropolitan station and in 1983 CTC celebrated 21 years of broadcasting. The station celebrated with a slight re-brand and the introduction of a new jingle Look at Us. A one-minute promo explaining to the viewers how professional the new image was went to air that year.

In 1987 the Broadcasting (Ownership and Control) Act replaced the Two TV Station rule – which had capped ownership of Metropolitan TV stations at two – with a 60% Reach rule. This would pave the way for major changes in television ownership in Australia as the three television networks expanded beyond Sydney and Melbourne, buying their affiliates in other capitals. At the time Kerry Stokes owned ADS 7 in Adelaide, CTC 7 in Canberra and had just won the licence for NEW 10 in Perth. Stokes had planned to buy the Seven Network from John Fairfax & Sons which would have seen CTC align with ATN 7 in Sydney and HSV 7 in Melbourne. Stokes offered $100 million more than rival Christopher Skase for Seven, but was ultimately unsuccessful.

Not able to build a metropolitan television network and with the costs associated with regional television aggregation looming, Stokes decided to sell. On 7 August 1987 Kerry Stokes sold CTC to Northern Star Holdings, owners of Network Ten along with ADS Adelaide and the licence for NEW Perth. In Adelaide, ADS 7 swapped frequencies later that year with SAS 10. CTC was already broadcasting on VHF 10 in the Tuggeranong Valley, Cooma and Goulburn (around a third of the potential audience), so a swap to VHF 10 wasn't viable. CTC would continue to be known as Capital 7 for another 18 months.

In 1988, CTC's programming began to evolve closer to Ten stations while still airing content from all three networks. In January Nine's Today Show was replaced with Network Ten's Good Morning Australia. Perhaps in an attempt to ingratiate local viewers lamenting the loss of the Today Show, on Monday 22 February, hosts Kerri-Anne Kennerley and Tim Webster broadcast a full episode of Good Morning Australia live from the front of New Parliament House in Canberra. At this time the half hour evening news was re-branded Eyewitness News. In September Eyewitness News launched a new a one-hour bulletin, bringing it in to line with the rest of the network.

At the same time CTC was preparing its launch in the Illawarra. Premises had been leased in Wollongong and a sales office and newsroom were being established. Capital 7 though would not be an appropriate name for the station; CTC wasn't going to supply Seven Network programming afterall so retaining the channel 7 moniker would have presented an anomaly. By the end of 1988 the news was branded Ten News and with that the station name Capital 7 disappeared and Capital Television had arrived; CTC's new identity emulated that of its new sister stations TEN Sydney, ATV Melbourne, TVQ Brisbane, ADS Adelaide and NEW Perth. The X logo was adopted denominated with Capital Television in place of TEN used for the other network stations. Network promos remained branded as TEN and the station began to be known locally as 'Capital 10'.

On 1 January 1989 CTC commenced daily 24-hour broadcasting for the first time.  A revelation to Canberrans for whom television had ceased shortly after midnight each evening, not commencing until 6am the following day. Now armed with Network Ten's stream of programs and branding, CTC was able to stay on the air all night, taking a feed from Sydney for the midnight-dawn shift.

CTC was in a relatively strong position in Canberra ahead of aggregation, which would see the station expand into the Illawarra, Central West and Riverina. CTC had a 24-hour schedule, a strong investment in equipment and infrastructure and a loyal viewership.

On Friday 31 March 1989, CTC launched its Illawarra service and rivals Prime and WIN came to Canberra. A new base had been established in Wollongong for sales and news staff. CTC broadcast its Canberra-based news bulletin to the Illawarra seven days a week, with a window for local stories created for both markets. It would be another nine months before aggregation was complete in the Riverina and Central West, as the new transmitters required to cover these vast regions were still under construction by the Federal Government.

By the middle of 1989 Ten's ratings were in decline so on 23 July, the recently recruited network boss Bob Shanks relaunched the network as 10 TV Australia. Rumours had been circulating that Shanks wanted rid of the network's X logo, as it reminded him on X-rated movies. CTC became 10 TV Australia with the local branding "CAPITAL" in place of the city name used in the metropolitan markets. The X logo was gone, replaced with a map of Australia. The following day, news services within Network Ten were retro-branded Eyewitness News, everywhere except Canberra. The Ten News brand had been far more successful in Canberra than elsewhere, so the station was give a 'stay of execution' in order to re-introduce Eyewitness News at a time appropriate to the audience.

Meanwhile, owners Northern Star Holdings were having financial and regulatory problems. The company was subject to an inquiry by the Australian Broadcasting Tribunal in relation to media ownership rules and had run into financial difficulties following the 1987 stock market crash two years earlier. On 1 September 1989, Northern Star Holdings announced a major restructure to pay off debts and help restore profitability. The proposals included selling off the network's three smaller stations; ADS Adelaide, NEW Perth and CTC Canberra to Charles Curran's Capital Television Group. The sale was complete on 27 October 1989, effectively splitting Northern Star's Network Ten in half and ending CTC's brief stint as a fully fledged member of Network Ten.

In December 1989, following the station's takeover by Curran, CTC's Wollongong newsroom was significantly scaled back, just eight months into its operation. The local news windows were removed from the nightly bulletin as two journalists and two camera operators were retrenched. A local news presence was never established for CTC's Riverina and Central West signals, which were coming online at that time.

1990s – A Capital idea 
The financial difficulties continued for Northern Star Holdings and on 14 September 1990 Network Ten, which by then consisted only of TEN Sydney, ATV Melbourne and TVQ Brisbane, went into receivership. By this time the TV Australia moniker had all but disappeared from network branding. On 13 January 1991 TV Australia was replaced with the launch of The Entertainment Network, a backronym that repositioned the network toward a younger demographic. At this time CTC dropped all Channel 10 branding in favour of Capital Television, the name of its parent company. The station took on an original ribbon logo for Capital Television reminiscent of the iconic Capital 7 flag of the 1980s. The station ID was a modified version of The Entertainment Network identity of Network Ten.

It was at this time that CTC ceased 24-hour broadcasting after only two years. CTC's branding no longer matched Network Ten, so rather than confuse Capital Television viewers with Channel 10 after midnight, the station would go off air around 1 am.

By 1993 Charles Curran was planning to expand his regional television holdings in NSW and bid to buy NRTV. The move could have trebled the reach of Capital Television in the state taking in Newcastle, Coffs Harbour and Taree. Curran was unsuccessful and NRTV was bought by a consortium made up of Jack Cowin, Kerry Stokes and Telecasters North Queensland. With little opportunity to expand his regional television holdings, Curren sold CTC to Southern Cross Broadcasting in December 1994, retaining ADS Adelaide and NEW Perth.

CTC's new owners, Southern Cross were quick to rationalise resources at CTC, much as they had done at their existing stations in Victoria. By early 1995 staff cuts had been announced, the local weekend news bulletin had been cancelled and on 6 February CTC was rebranded Ten Capital in a move that would eliminate resources required to rebadge Network Ten station promos and IDs. Just five years earlier the station had been known colloquially as Capital 10. CTC re-commenced 24-hour broadcasting at this time.

2000s – A Star is born 
In the spring of 2001, following a year of rapid growth, Southern Cross cancelled the station's one-hour weekday news bulletin ending 40 years of local news production. CTC was rebranded Southern Cross Ten in 2002 as the company had acquired Ten affiliate stations in North Queensland from Telecasters Australia and all Ten stations, including CTC, were brought into line with the generic Southern Cross Ten brand. The branding was light, with a simple denominator below the Network Ten logo. For viewers, CTC was for the first time a 100% relay of TEN Sydney, with the only differentiator the insertion of local advertisements and the occasional local weather update.

In 2004 Southern Cross Ten was forced to reintroduce local news content following a ruling by the Australian Broadcasting Authority. The CTC studios in Watson became a news hub, with a small team of journalists pre-recording news updates to be broadcast across the Southern Cross Ten network.

In 2005 the Southern Cross Ten Star arrived on screen differentiating the regional stations more clearly from metropolitan Network Ten. Southern Cross Ten continued to largely use Network Ten IDs and promos unchanged, but mixed in Southern Cross Ten versions of network IDs. Community Service Announcements and local news updates were branded with the Southern Cross Ten Star.

2016 – The switch to Channel 9 
On 1 July 2016, Southern Cross changed its programming alliance from Network Ten to the Nine Network in Canberra, southern NSW, Victoria and Queensland as part of a five-year agreement. CTC, along with almost all Southern Cross Ten stations rebranded as Channel 9 ending a 27-year affiliation with Ten. (In Northern NSW Southern Cross Ten continued its Ten affiliation due to Nine owning their existing station, NBN). The change was reminiscent of the 'frequency swap' between ADS and SAS Adelaide in 1987 which became Channel 10 and Channel 7 respectively. CTC is the only television station in Australia that has been known as Channel 7, Channel 9 and Channel 10.

2017 – Demolition of Watson studios proposed 
In December 2016 Southern Cross Austereo lodged a planning application with the ACT Government to demolish the CTC studios, administration and playout facility to make way for a residential development. The proposed studio campus demolition comes just over a year after WIN television closed its Canberra studios at Kingston, moving its offices to the industrial suburb of Fyshwick. The trend of vast television estates making way for residential developments has been seen in Sydney, Melbourne and Perth. In 2009 however, a planned redevelopment of the original ATV studios at Nunawading in Melbourne was cancelled due to a slump in property prices.

In September 2018 Southern Cross Austereo announced it would transfer its Canberra-based broadcast playout to NPC Media, a joint venture between the Nine and Seven Networks. CTC would move remaining employees to a leased office facility in Canberra. The changes were expected to be completed by 30 June 2020.

2020 – Demolition of Watson studios 
In August 2020 demolition of the entire studio site at Watson was completed to make way for a housing development. The demolition marked the end of 46 years as Canberra's home of television and Australia's first colour television station.

2021 - Switch back to Channel 10 
In March 2021, it was announced that SCA's partner Nine Network would be switching its affiliation back to former long-term partner WIN Television. With this announcement, SCA was effectively stripped of its 5-year agreement with Nine. In response SCA entered affiliation talks with former long-term partner Network 10, with further confirmation that CTC would switch back to Channel 10 programming as part of a 2-year network deal from 1 July 2021.

Programming
As the only commercial television station in Canberra, CTC's programming operated independently from the television networks from its inception in 1962 until television aggregation in 1989 - though many viewers noticed CTC began to evolve towards the Ten Network schedule in early 1988 after the station was bought by the network. Independence meant CTC was free to choose programs from any source and the station claimed for many years that over 80% of Australia's top rating programs were broadcast in Canberra. However, local residents would often complain of big name television programs missing from the Canberra schedule, while cheap repeats of American sitcoms such as Bewitched and Gilligan's Island were staples until the late 1980s.

The popular Nine Network variety program Hey Hey It's Saturday was never broadcast by CTC nor were lifestyle program Burke's Backyard, game show Wheel of Fortune or the Seven Network dramas Sons and Daughters and Home & Away. The original Seven Network series of Neighbours aired from May to December 1985 in one-hour double episodes on Wednesdays at 7.30pm, however only around 50 of the original 170 episodes were broadcast in Canberra at that time. Neighbours returned unceremoniously 18 months later to CTC on 1 June 1987 at 5.30pm weeknights.

A Country Practice also aired on the station as did fellow Australian soap operas E Street, Richmond Hill and The Sullivans, current affairs program 60 Minutes, children's fantasy drama series Ocean Girl and H2O: Just Add Water, science program Beyond 2000, quiz show Sale of the Century and medical drama The Flying Doctors. CTC was an early adopter of the raunchy 0-10 Network dramas Number 96 and The Box, screening both programs from their inception (1972 and 1974 respectively).

News and current affairs
CTC has a long and rich history of quality local news and current affairs production. News bulletins aired for almost 40 years until being axed at the end of 2001. The news format varied over the years but from the early 1970s was a separate 10–20 minute local bulletin followed by national news taken from ATN 7 in Sydney.
In 1980, under new owner Kerry Stokes, CTC scaled up its local news bulletin to 30 minutes at 6pm on weekdays, followed by Seven National News from Sydney. In October 1981 CTC launched its first one-hour local, national and international bulletin, airing at 6pm weeknights presented by Tony Campbell and John Bok. By 1982, John Bok was presenting alongside Laurie Wilson and Australian Capital News was also airing for 30 minutes on weekends.

1982 also saw a big change for CTC's morning newscasting with the introduction of breakfast news television. CTC began broadcasting the Nine Network's National News Today (which would become the National Today Show on 28 June of that year) presented by Canberra broadcasting veteran Steve Liebmann at 7am weekdays. Perhaps in a nod to his local Canberra profile, CTC opted to broadcast Nine's breakfast program rather Network Ten's Good Morning Australia which had been on air for over a year and was preferred by most regional stations. For the first time in its 20-year history the station was broadcasting daily before 9am.

By 1985 the CTC newsroom boasted 14 journalists, 3 sports journalists and a sports presenter. The nightly bulletin also had the luxury of three camera operators during transmission. On 10 January 1986 John Bok, who had become a high-profile personality for CTC in the Canberra community, read his last bulletin to take up a role with ABC in Adelaide. David Allen took over as the station's chief news anchor as the bulletin was scaled down to a half-hour composite, which at that time was using the Nine Network news theme and graphics.

Having acquired CTC in 1987, Network Ten began an overhaul of the news service. Ken Begg was appointed News Director, joining from ABC replacing Bill Muldrew, with the clear brief to 'make the news better'. The Nine Network graphics and news theme were ditched and the bulletin was rebranded Eyewitness News aligning with the rest of the network and a late night locally produced half-hour current affairs program called This Week commenced, hosted by David Allen and Niree Creed. The program aired at 10.30pm Thursday evenings and boasted 'international content' which at the time was a point worth making owing to the expensive satellite equipment required to air news from overseas.

In January 1988 CTC's programming began to more closely emulate that of Network Ten. Nine's Today Show, which CTC had broadcast on weekday mornings for nearly six years, was replaced with Ten's Good Morning Australia, while National Nine Morning News gave way to Ten Eyewitness News This Morning. The rebadged Capital 7 Eyewitness News adopted Turn to News by Frank Gari as the title track to its broadcasts, following the lead of TVQ-0 in Brisbane.

Face to Face 
In August 1988 Network Ten launched its own Sunday morning political news program Face to Face. Hosted by then Political Editor for the network, Kerry O'Brien, Face to Face had an identical set at CTC Canberra, ATV Melbourne and TEN Sydney with the program broadcast from whichever city the main guest was in at the time.  Face to Face would run until 1989 and was the first national program to be produced and broadcast from CTC.

The News Hour Returns 
On Monday 19 September 1988 CTC's new one-hour Eyewitness News bulletin went to air at 6pm – just in time to cover day two of the Seoul Olympics. The relaunched newscast was hosted by veteran ABC newscaster Geoff Hiscock and TV8's Christine Kininmonth alongside weather presenter Mike Larkan and sports presenter Greg Robson. The team would steer CTC through the impending launch of two rival commercial stations which would see the viewing audience split into three within six months. A new set was constructed at the CTC studios in Watson in the same style as other Network Ten stations. During construction the news had been temporarily broadcast from Black Mountain Tower.

By March 1989 the bulletin had been re-branded Ten News and CTC was a fully fledged Network Ten station in time for the arrival of Prime and WIN in Canberra and ready to take on those rivals in the Illawarra. Similar to the structure of CTC's Nine News today, the bulletin had a local opt-out window for the Illawarra, where stories produced from CTC's Wollongong base would be inserted. This format lasted barely nine months, with the Wollongong news crew retrenched in December 1989 following the September takeover of CTC by Charles Curran. Riverina and Central West viewers had only just begun to receive CTC and a local news presence was never established.

The station's commitment to metropolitan quality news in Canberra saw CTC defy other Network Ten affiliates in Australia, maintaining a number one position in the ratings for three years after Prime and WIN commenced broadcasting in that city. The one-hour locally produced bulletin would remain on screens almost unchanged for 13 years.

In 1991 the news bulletin was re-branded Capital Eyewitness News, following CTC's name change back to Capital Television.

The First at Five Failure 
Following suit with the rest Network Ten, CTC moved Capital Eyewitness News an hour earlier to 5pm in February 1992. The 'First at Five' slogan was emblazoned across Canberra on buses and in newspaper ads. The move to 5pm gave Network Ten an edge in other cities against its rival news bulletins. In Canberra there were no other local/national/international bulletins on air, but the half-hour 6pm local news on rival WIN was proving popular. However, in both a testament to the loyalty of its audience and a question mark over the wisdom of management, the 'First at Five' move was met with fierce protest by viewers. Not only had the beloved 'Channel 7 News' as it was colloquially known been moved an hour earlier, but the 6pm-7pm slot had been filled by the tabloid current affairs programme Hinch and the low-budget American dating show Studs. Canberra was having none of it and CTC restored the bulletin to 6pm after just six weeks. Bus ads were hastily amended with stickers covering the timeslot noting the news was 'First at Six'.

For CTC's markets outside of Canberra, things were a little different. The Illawarra, Central West and Riverina received news from TEN-10 in Sydney, rather than the Canberra bulletin. For these markets the news remained at 5pm for the next 14 years until the affiliation change to Nine.

The 1993 Canberra TV News War 
Four years after aggregation, Prime, which had had a stop/start approach to local news in Canberra, decided to take on CTC head-to-head with a one-hour local/national/international 6pm news bulletin. Prime's first attempt at news in Canberra saw the station lure CTC alumnus John Bok back from Adelaide in 1989 to produce and front a 30-minute local news bulletin. However, Prime couldn't drag the audience from CTC and in April 1991 the bulletin was scaled back to a five-minute update shown at the end of Seven Nightly News from Sydney.

In 1993 Prime decided to try again and a team of 26 including Ken Begg and Geoff Hiscock, both poached from CTC, were brought together to upgrade Prime's news. The now nationally known faces of Melissa Doyle and Jessica Rowe would also join Prime's news team. Meanwhile, sports presenter Greg Robson took over from Hiscock anchoring Capital Eyewitness News at CTC alongside Kininmonth and WIN maintained its half-hour local news bulletin anchored by veteran Canberra broadcaster Peter Leonard. Prime's 6 O'clock News commenced on 1 March 1993 amid a high-profile advertising campaign. For the first time since aggregation, viewers had the choice of three locally produced television 6pm news bulletins, two of which were composite local, national and international.

1993 would go down in history as the pinnacle of local TV choice for Canberra, with buses and newspapers plastered with the faces of three newsrooms. But it wasn't to last and by Christmas 1993 Prime had scaled back its one-hour composite to a half-hour local bulletin. Capital Eyewitness News prevailed as the number one news program followed by fierce rival WIN.

1995 – The beginning of the end 
Soon after CTC was purchased by Southern Cross Broadcasting (as it was then known), the newsroom was subject to extensive staff cuts. The cancellation of the half-hour weekend bulletin was the most obvious sign things were changing. In Canberra, the news was re-branded Ten Capital Eyewitness News, encapsulating the station's rebrand.

Over the next five years, limited resources were invested into the newsroom and technical glitches were becoming more obvious to viewers. Ten year old camera tapes were having to be reused with tape wear showing on screen. Sound desks from the early 1970s were also beginning to fail leading to breaks in audio on-air. Despite the lack of investment in technical equipment, the CTC newsroom maintained its selection of local and national stories and broad coverage of international news.

By 1997, the bulletin had simplified its name to Ten Capital News. The 1990s had been a decade of soft ratings for Network Ten and the legacy of CTC's 'Channel 7' glory days had long been forgotten. Owners Southern Cross Broadcasting tapped the final nail in the coffin of the locally produced news bulletin in 2001 blaming declining audience and the expense of upgrading equipment for digital broadcasting. The axing, in the same year as Prime cancelled its half-hour local bulletin in Canberra, sparked an Australian Broadcasting Authority investigation into regional television news. No news bulletins were restored as a result.

Local news was re-introduced to the station in 2004 in the form of three-minute updates at various times of the day. The news updates were produced by Southern Cross News and aired from the CTC Canberra studios. A local half-hour magazine program called State Focus also commenced production at this time to contribute to minimum local content rules. State Focus aired on Sunday mornings before Meet the Press.

From the end of 2001 CTC aired the one-hour weekday state and half-hour weekend national 10 News First bulletins from TEN Sydney at 5 pm. CTC would later carry The Project and The Bolt Report. State level and national news updates from TEN Sydney were also broadcast.

2016 – Nine News Hour 
On 1 July 2016, Southern Cross Austereo changed its on-air affiliation deal for its Southern Cross Ten stations to align with the Nine Network. CTC broadcast daily national Nine News Canberra bulletins produced in Sydney as well as its flagship Sydney-based bulletin on weekends, A Current Affair, Today Extra, national and state updates. Two programs returned to CTC under the affiliation deal, Today re-commenced on air for the first time since 1987 as well as 60 Minutes which was last broadcast by CTC in 1988.

Locally produced news updates continued on CTC after the change to Channel 9, however owners Southern Cross Austereo announced they would 'scale up' the three-minute 'rip and read' news updates with the re-introduction of full news bulletins at the earliest opportunity ending years of dependence on national and state newscasts.

In November 2016 the Nine Network announced it would commence production of 15 localised news bulletins including a one-hour service for Canberra. While journalists would be based at the CTC offices in Watson, the bulletin would read from TCN studios in Sydney, contrary to earlier speculation the Watson news studios would be brought back to life. The weather segment was pre-recorded at NBN in Newcastle.

Former ABC weather presenter Vanessa O’Hanlon was announced as the anchor for the service at the Nine Network's 2017 program launch. On 18 January 2017, News Director Mike Dalton announced the first bulletin reporters for CTC in 15 years as Harry Frost and Rosana Kingsun (both from WIN News Canberra), Emma Larouche (from GTS/BKN Southern Cross News presented from Canberra) and Mike Lorigan (NBN News Central Coast).

On 6 February 2017 the first edition of Nine News Canberra went to air. The bulletin was produced in the same way as NBN News in Newcastle, where a generic bulletin framework was read live, with windows for pre-recorded local news, sport and weather. The Nine News Canberra bulletin framework was shared with the Illawarra, Riverina and Central West markets, each with its own local content windows. The shared weather segment for Canberra/Illawarra was pre-recorded at NBN studios in Newcastle. The historic first broadcast marked a return to local news for the station after 15 years.

On 17 March 2020, following the outbreak of coronavirus, Nine News announced the temporary cancellation of their regional, hour-long news bulletins.

2020 – Nine News Local 
Localised news bulletins returned to CTC on Monday 10 August 2020, with some major changes. The bulletin was cut to a 30-minute program covering the ACT and all of southern NSW (Illawarra, Riverina and Central West) in one broadcast. Airing live at 5.30pm, the bulletin was followed by the state edition of Nine News at 6 pm.

Former news reporter Natassia Soper took over from Vanessa O'Hanlon reading news and sport with Mike Lorigan relocating to Nine News Adelaide. Weather continued to be presented by Gavin Morris from the NBN studios in Newcastle, covering the entire broadcast area.

Presenters 
 Natassia Soper
 Gavin Morris (Weather)

Reporters 
 Harry Frost
 Kimberley Caines

Former presenters

Former reporters

2021 – 10 News First 
Following the announcement that SCA would switch its affiliation back to Channel 10 from 1 July 2021, due to Nine switching back to WIN Television on the same day, the Nine News Local bulletins ceased production after 5 years with the last bulletin airing on 30 June 2021, due to Nine affiliate WIN operating its own local news service. This marked the end of locally produced news bulletins again for CTC after 5 years with no plans to continue local news bulletins under Network 10 affiliation. CTC returned to rip and read news updates on 1 July 2021, the same day that SCA began its new affiliation with Network 10. The news updates carry the 10 News First look and feel with the updates produced from the network’s station in Hobart. Apart from updates CTC carries 10 News First from Sydney (state bulletins on weekdays, national bulletins on weekends), The Project, The Sunday Project and mid morning program Studio 10.

Entertainment programs

An Evening With 
An Evening With was a variety program which aired from 1966 to 1967. Co-produced by Jack Sluyters and David Brice, who was also the host, An Evening With was broadcast monthly featuring both Canberra-based and interstate talent. The first episode went to air at 9.30pm on Tuesday 23 August 1966 and was entitled An Evening With Treblefolk, a local trio formed by Brian Triglone who is still involved in folk music in Canberra today. Little Pattie appeared as the main performer in a 1967 episode.

Tonight in Canberra 
Tonight in Canberra was a short-lived series which aired in 1968 from April to August on Mondays at 10.05 pm. The series presented a mix of interviews and variety acts. It was hosted by David Brice, who was assisted by Steve Liebmann. The content varied in entertainment quality with one episode featuring an interview with Christmas card designer Gordon Fraser and an interview with an inspector for the RSPCA while a different episode featured an interview with NSW Minister for Lands, Tom Lewis, and an interview with chairman of the ACT Advisory Council, Jim Pead.

While working for CTC, presenter David Brice optioned the rights of a book by Don and Elizabeth Coleman about a student protest against an Asian security conference to be held in Canberra. Demonstrator commenced filming in September 1970. The film was released the following year and achieved some success in Canberra but was a commercial and critical disappointment.

Tonight with Frank Jones 
Tonight with Frank Jones was a revival of the variety show format produced at CTC, airing on Saturday nights at 9.30pm in the mid-1970s.

Meeting in the Middle 
Meeting in the Middle was an innovative early Sunday evening chat show hosted by Canberra teenagers that ran for 26 weeks from 17 June 1979. Teenagers interviewed celebrities asking questions they devised themselves. The show was the brain child of Desmond Bishop, who ran the Canberra Children's Television Workshop at CTC and aimed 'to bridge the generation gap'.

Constable Kenny on Duty 
In the 1980s Constable Kenny on Duty was essential viewing, appearing during the afternoon program Children's Hour. Alongside the ever grumpy Sergeant Bully, Kenny would teach Canberra boys and girls important life lessons, such as how to cross the road safely. The program also included trips to the local zoo and letters from viewers. Constable Kenny had previously appeared in a programs called Constable Kenny's Casebook and Junior Police 7.

Rock Till Dawn 
At the end of 1985 CTC followed the trend of metropolitan stations and introduced a midnight till dawn music video program running on Friday and Saturday night. Hosted by local radio DJ Rob Duckworth, Rock Till Dawn featured studio performances and interviews as well as standard music videos. A clip of Rock Till Dawn can be seen today featuring the Doug Anthony All Stars in which host Rob incorrectly refers to the studio location as Dickson, when in fact he was further up Northbourne Avenue in Watson.

The Up-Late Game Show 
In 2005 the first regular, nationally broadcast TV program in 16 years was produced at CTC studios in Canberra. The Up-Late Game Show was a 90-minute late night interactive television quiz program shown across Network Ten, written and hosted by Big Brother contestant Simon Deering, commonly known by the nickname Hotdogs. The show's format had the host presenting simple puzzles which viewers could attempt to solve over the phone. Successfully solving a puzzle would result in a cash prize for the contestant. The program had two series and went to air for the final time on Friday 15 December 2006.

Community and sport 
CTC's Community Billboard was synonymous with early evening viewing in Canberra in the 1970s and 1980s. Read by a member of the news team, Community Billboard was a five-minute presentation of upcoming not-for-profit community events around Canberra. When the station was acquired by Network Ten in 1987, Community Billboard was scaled back to three minutes so it could run within commercial breaks during the day. The mini-program ran on CTC for 30 years until the format was adopted by local rivals WIN and Prime and subsequently dropped by CTC.

In the 1970s and 1980s CTC's weekend schedule was heavily padded with local and national sport coverage. A four-hour program Sports Action dominated the schedule on Saturday afternoons, showing a selection of sporting events from around the country. With only one commercial television station in Canberra, whether to show AFL or Rugby League matches was always a hotly contentious issue.

The Canberra Birdman Rally broadcast by CTC from 1985 to 1992 during the Canberra Festival was possibly the most visible community event run by the station. At its peak, over 100,000 spectators would line Lake Burley Griffin to watch contestants jump from a 10-metre platform, aiming to glide 50 metres to win the $10,000 prize.

Main transmitters

Notes

See also
 Regional television in Australia
 Southern Cross 10

References

Television stations in Canberra
Television stations in New South Wales
Television channels and stations established in 1962
Southern Cross Media Group